Washington Township is one of the fourteen townships of Union County, Ohio, United States.  The 2010 census found 824 people in the township.

Geography
Located in the northwestern corner of the county, it borders the following townships:
Hale Township, Hardin County - north
Bowling Green Township, Marion County - northeast
Jackson Township - east
York Township - south
Bokes Creek Township, Logan County - west

No municipalities are located in Washington Township, although the unincorporated community of Byhalia is located in the township's south.

Name and history
It is one of the forty-three Washington Townships statewide.

Washington Township was organized in 1836.

Government
The township is governed by a three-member board of trustees, who are elected in November of odd-numbered years to a four-year term beginning on the following January 1. Two are elected in the year after the presidential election and one is elected in the year before it. There is also an elected township fiscal officer, who serves a four-year term beginning on April 1 of the year after the election, which is held in November of the year before the presidential election. Vacancies in the fiscal officership or on the board of trustees are filled by the remaining trustees.

References

External links
Township website
County website

Townships in Union County, Ohio
Townships in Ohio
Populated places established in 1836
1836 establishments in Ohio